There have been 74 Formula One drivers from France, the most successful of them being Alain Prost who won the World Drivers' Championship four times.

World champions and race winners
The title has been won by a French driver on four occasions, all of which were victories for Alain Prost. Thirteen other drivers have won at least one race, though they are all far behind Prost's tally of 51 wins.

Alain Prost debuted with McLaren in 1980. He finished in the points on four occasions but only finished 16th overall, moving to Renault for the following season. After three successful years, including finishing the 1983 season as the championship runner-up, he returned to McLaren. Prost drove with the team between 1984 and 1989, winning the championship three times and coming second twice. During this time McLaren introduced a new team-mate for Prost – Ayrton Senna. Their relationship was difficult and the pair clashed on and off the track, leading to it being described as "one of the sport's greatest ever rivalries". Prost joined Ferrari in 1990 and resumed his battle with Senna, losing the championship at the penultimate race of the season after the pair collided. In 1991 the Ferrari was uncompetitive and for the first time since his debut season Prost was unable to win a race. He publicly slated the team for their performances and was subsequently fired before the end of the year. He took a year off in 1992 and returned for one last season in 1993, winning his fourth championship.

René Arnoux won seven races during a career than spanned 12 years, having made his debut in 1978 with Martini. The team folded part way through the season, and he secured a drive with Renault for the following year. For some of his time there he partnered Alain Prost, and he controversially ignored team orders to win the 1982 French Grand Prix ahead of his favoured teammate. He moved to Scuderia Ferrari and enjoyed his most successful season, winning three races and finishing third in the championship. Ligier signed Arnoux for four seasons from 1986 and he retired after several years of poor performance.
Jacques Laffite, who developed Ligier race cars, won six races and finished fourth in the drivers title in three successive seasons (1979–1981) : he was the first French driver to win a Grand Prix, in Sweden, for a French team, with a French car and a French engine (Matra V12). His Formula One career began in 1974 and ended with a serious accident at the 1986 British Grand Prix, though he still raced in other disciplines.

Didier Pironi started his Formula One career in 1978 with Tyrrell. He moved to Ligier in 1980 alongside compatriot Jacques Laffite, frequently outpacing the team leader. He won that year's Belgian Grand Prix and finished fifth in the championship. He signed with Ferrari as partner to Gilles Villeneuve but could not keep pace with the French-Canadian. In 1982, the year of Villeneuve's death, Pironi looked set to win the championship having won two races and finished on the podium six times. At the German Grand Prix he crashed during a practice session, breaking his legs and ending both his title challenge and his career.
Patrick Tambay made his Formula One debut in 1977 with Ensign. He signed for McLaren for his second year in the sport but the car was never particularly competitive. He left the team at the end of 1979, being replaced by Alain Prost for his first year in the sport. Tambay returned in 1981 after a year in the US but was dropped at the end of the season. He announced his retirement but was asked to drive for Ferrari for the second half of the 1982 season after the death of their driver, and close friend of Tambay, Gilles Villeneuve. He won one race and stayed with Ferrari for the following season, winning once more. After two years with Renault and one with Lola he retired for a second time.
Maurice Trintignant competed in the inaugural season of the Formula One World Championship, debuting at the 1950 Monaco Grand Prix in a Simca-Gordini. Five years later he became the first French driver to win a World Championship Grand Prix at the same circuit. His only other race win also came at Monaco when he took the chequered flag in the 1958 Monaco Grand Prix. He retired in 1964 having raced with ten different teams.

Patrick Depailler, who developed and drove the 6-wheeled Tyrrell P34, won the 1978 Monaco Grand Prix for the British team (albeit in a conventional 4-wheeled car, shortly after the P34 experiment was abandoned) and the 1979 Spanish Grand Prix for Ligier. He died at the Hockenheimring, during testing ahead of the 1980 German Grand Prix.
Jean-Pierre Jabouille, who developed and drove the Renault turbo,  won the 1979 French Grand Prix and the 1980 Austrian Grand Prix for the French team.
François Cevert won the 1971 United States Grand Prix for Tyrrell. He died after an accident in practice of 1973 United States Grand Prix.
Jean-Pierre Beltoise, iconic Matra driver, won the 1973 Monaco Grand Prix for BRM.
Jean Alesi is the only French driver to be in the "200-plus club", having competed in 201 races and being one of only a small number of drivers to reach the landmark. He made his debut in 1989 and raced with a variety of teams until his retirement in 2001. He scored 31 podium finishes but only won one race – the 1995 Canadian Grand Prix.
Olivier Panis won in Monaco in 1996 when only three cars finished the wet race. It was his only win.
Pierre Gasly won the 2020 Italian Grand Prix.
Esteban Ocon is the most recent French driver to have secured a race victory, winning at the 2021 Hungarian Grand Prix.

Driver statistics

Current drivers
In the 2023 Formula One season there are two French drivers.

Pierre Gasly made his debut for Scuderia Toro Rosso at the 2017 Malaysian Grand Prix. He was then promoted to Red Bull Racing for 2019 after Daniel Ricciardo left the team, before being demoted back to Toro Rosso mid-season. At the 2020 Italian Grand Prix, Gasly became the first French driver to win an F1 race since Olivier Panis in 1996.

Esteban Ocon made his debut at the 2016 Belgian Grand Prix and is driving for Alpine in 2023.

See also
List of Formula One Grand Prix winners

Notes

References